This is a list of all penalty shoot-outs that have occurred in the Copa América.

Complete list
Key
 = scored penalty
 = scored penalty which ended the shoot-out
 = missed penalty
 = missed penalty which ended the shoot-out
 = first penalty in the shoot-out
horizontal line within a list of takers = beginning of the sudden death stage

Statistics
Key
† = shoot-out in the final
Bold = winners that year

Shoot-out records
Fewest shoot-outs in a tournament (since 1993)
1 – 1997, 2001, 2007

Most shoot-outs in a tournament
4 – 1995

Most played shoot-outs
3 –  vs  (1993, 1995, 2004†),  vs  (1993, 2015, 2021),  vs  (2011, 2015, 2019),  vs  (1995†, 2004, 2007)

Fewest penalties in a shoot-out
7 –  vs  (2015†),  vs  (2011),  vs  (1995)

Most penalties in a shoot-out
14 –  vs  (2015),  vs  (2007)

Fewest penalties scored in a shoot-out
2 –  vs  (2011)

Most penalties scored in a shoot-out
11 –  vs  (1993),  vs  (1993)

Most penalties missed in a shoot-out
5 –  vs  (2015),  vs  (2007),  vs  (1997),  vs  (2011),  vs  (2021)

Team records
Most shoot-outs played
10 –  (1993, 1995†, 1999×2, 2001, 2004, 2007, 2011, 2019, 2021)

Most shoot-outs played in a tournament
2 –  (1993, 2015†),  (1995, 2004†),  (1993, 2021),  (2011),  (1999)

Most shoot-out wins
5 –  (1995, 2004†×2, 2007, 2019)

Most shoot-out wins in a tournament
2 –  (1993),  (2004†),  (2011),  (1999)

Most shoot-out losses
6 –  (1993, 2001, 2004, 2007, 2019, 2021)

Most consecutive shoot-out wins
3 –  (2004†×2, 2007),  (2015†, 2016†, 2019),  (2011×2, 2015),  (1995† , 1999×2)

Most consecutive shoot-out losses
3 –  (2001, 2004, 2007)

Most shoot-out wins without losses
1 –  (2001),  (1995)

Most shoot-out losses without wins
1 –  (1997),  (2011)

Most knockout matches played without shoot-outs (since 1993)
5 –  (1995, 1997×3, 2015)

Fewest penalties scored in a shoot-out
0 –  (2011)

Most penalties scored in a shoot-out
6 –  (1993×2)

Most penalties missed in a shoot-out
4 –  (2011)

Taker records
Most shoot-outs played
5 –  Lionel Messi (2011, 2015†×2, 2016†, 2021)

Most penalties scored in shoot-outs
4 –  Lionel Messi (2011, 2015†×2, 2021),  Juan Cuadrado (2015, 2016, 2019, 2021)

Most penalties missed in shoot-outs
2 –  Lucas Biglia (2015, 2016†),  Christian Cueva (2016, 2021)

Most final penalties scored in shoot-outs
2 –  Jorge Borelli (1993×2),  Alexis Sánchez (2015†, 2019),  Federico Magallanes (1999×2)

Goalkeeper records
Most shoot-outs played
5 –  David Ospina (2015, 2016, 2019, 2021×2)

Fewest penalties faced in shoot-outs
3 –  Brad Friedel (1995)

Most penalties faced in shoot-outs
24 –  David Ospina

Fewest penalties conceded in shoot-outs
1 –  Brad Friedel

Most penalties conceded in shoot-outs
17 –  Sergio Romero (2011, 2015†×2, 2016†),  David Ospina

Most penalties missed against (saves and off-target shots) in shoot-outs
7 –  David Ospina,  Justo Villar (2011×2, 2015)

Fewest penalties conceded in a shoot-out
0 –  Justo Villar (2011)

Most penalties conceded in a shoot-out
6 –  Zetti (1993),  Óscar Córdoba (1993)

Most penalties missed against (saves and off-target shots) in a shoot-out
4 –  Justo Villar (2011)

By team

By tournament
From 1993 to 2007, if the score was level after 90 minutes, a penalty shoot-out followed immediately. In 2011, any knockout match (in 2015, 2016 and 2021, only the final) might go into extra time. In 2019, immediate shoot-outs could be used in the quarter-finals only.

See also
List of FIFA World Cup penalty shoot-outs
List of UEFA European Championship penalty shoot-outs

References

Penalty shoot-outs